Saxton Daryl Crawford Sr. (October 6, 1881 – February 11, 1964) was an American football player and coach. He served as the head coach at the University of Tennessee for one season in 1904, compiling a record 3–5–1. Crawford was the first Tennessee head coach to record a win against the rival Alabama Crimson Tide.  Crawford died on February 11, 1964, at a hospital in Birmingham, Alabama.

Head coaching record

References

External links
 

1881 births
1964 deaths
American football quarterbacks
Tennessee Volunteers football coaches
Tennessee Volunteers football players
Sportspeople from Knoxville, Tennessee
Players of American football from Knoxville, Tennessee